Ebrahim Masoudi Karijani (born 16 August 1982) is an Iranian professional futsal player.

Honours

Country 
 Asian Indoor Games
 Champion (1): 2007
 Grand Prix
 Runner-Up (1): 2009
 WAFF Futsal Championship
 Champion (1): 2007

Club 
 Iranian Futsal Super League
 Champion (1): 2005–06 (Shensa)
 Runner-Up (2): 2010–11 (Giti Pasand) – 2011–12 (Giti Pasand)
 Golden CUP
 Champion (1): 2007 (Shensa)

Individual 
 Offensive fastest goal in World Cup 2008 Brazil

References

External links
 
 Official website

Iranian men's futsal players
Iranian footballers
Association football forwards
1982 births
Living people
Persepolis FSC players
Shensa Saveh FSC players
Tam Iran Khodro FSC players
Giti Pasand FSC players
Almas Shahr Qom FSC players
Parsian FSC players
Iranian expatriate futsal players
People from Karaj
21st-century Iranian people